Victor Wembanyama (born 4 January 2004) is a French professional basketball player for Metropolitans 92 of the LNB Pro A. He is widely projected to be the first overall pick in the 2023 NBA draft and is considered one of the greatest prospects of his generation.

Born in Le Chesnay, France, Wembanyama began his professional career with Nanterre 92 of the LNB Pro A in 2019. Two years later, he moved to ASVEL and won the Pro A title in his only season with the team. In 2022, Wembanyama signed with Metropolitans 92 and assumed a leading role. He has been named an LNB All-Star on two occasions, winning All-Star Game MVP once, and is a two-time LNB Pro A Best Young Player.

Wembanyama plays for the French national basketball team. At the youth level, he has led his team to two silver medals, including at the 2021 FIBA Under-19 World Cup, where he set the FIBA record for blocks per game in a single tournament.

Early life and youth career 
Wembanyama was born on 4 January 2004 in Le Chesnay, France. His father, Félix, is of Congolese descent and was a track and field athlete who competed in the high jump, long jump and triple jump. His mother, Elodie de Fautereau, is a basketball coach and former player. His older sister, Eve, plays basketball professionally, and his younger brother, Oscar, has played basketball and handball at the youth level. His grandfather, Michel de Fautereau, played professional basketball, and his grandmother, Marie Christine, also played the sport.

Wembanyama played football as a goalkeeper and practiced judo before focusing on basketball. He learned how to play basketball from his mother, who was coaching youth teams. At age seven, Wembanyama began playing for Entente Le Chesnay Versailles, before joining the youth system of Nanterre 92 at age 10. In February 2018, Wembanyama was loaned to FC Barcelona for the Minicopa del Rey, an under-14 tournament in Spain, leading his team to third place. He declined an offer to continue his career with Barcelona, citing that the coaches were not willing to challenge him.

Professional career

Nanterre 92 (2019–2021)
In the 2019–20 season, Wembanyama gained his first professional experience with the Nanterre 92 senior team under head coach Pascal Donnadieu, receiving limited playing time in two games. He primarily competed in LNB Espoirs, the French under-21 league, and also played for the under-18 team. Wembanyama made his professional debut on 29 October 2019, playing 31 seconds against Brescia in the EuroCup. At 15 years, nine months and 25 days old, he was the second-youngest player after Stefan Petković to play in the EuroCup. In February 2020, Wembanyama played for Nanterre's under-18 team at the Kaunas qualifying tournament for the Adidas Next Generation Tournament (ANGT). On 8 February, he posted 22 points, 15 rebounds and an ANGT-record nine blocks in a win over the under-18 team of Zaragoza. Wembanyama averaged 15.8 points, 12 rebounds, 2.8 steals, and six blocks per game in Kaunas, leading the tournament in blocks and earning all-tournament team honors. He finished the Espoirs season averaging 10.2 points, 4.9 rebounds and 3.3 blocks per game, mostly coming off the bench. 

In the 2020–21 season, Wembanyama split time between Nanterre's senior and under-21 teams and signed an agreement to also play for Centre Fédéral in the Nationale Masculine 1 (NM1). On 23 September 2020, he made his LNB Pro A debut, grabbing one rebound in four minutes against JL Bourg. In October, Wembanyama featured in a viral video, where at age 16, he showcased his skills in a two-on-two pick-up game against Rudy Gobert, one of the top defensive players in the world, and Vincent Poirier. On 12 December, he suffered a stress fracture in his fibula during an Espoirs game against BCM Gravelines-Dunkerque, with an estimated recovery time of eight weeks. Wembanyama was sidelined from the Valencia qualifying tournament for the ANGT. After missing two and a half months with injury, he began receiving more playing time with the senior team. On 25 May 2021, Wembanyama recorded season-highs of 14 points and 10 rebounds in a 99–87 win over Orléans Loiret. He started in 10 of 18 Pro A appearances, averaging 6.8 points and 4.7 rebounds per game, and was named Pro A Best Young Player. In Espoirs, Wembanyama averaged 13.4 points, 8.6 rebounds and 3.2 blocks, starting in all five of his games. He played four games for Centre Fédéral, averaging 11.8 points, 6.8 rebounds and three blocks per game. Following the season, he opted to leave Nanterre.

ASVEL (2021–2022)

On 29 June 2021, Wembanyama signed a three-year contract with ASVEL of the Pro A and the EuroLeague. He was unable to play for one month at the start of the season because of an illness. On 1 October, Wembanyama made his EuroLeague debut, recording one block in three minutes in an 88–76 win over Žalgiris. On 10 November, ASVEL announced that he would miss two to three weeks with a fractured finger. He returned on 2 December but was sidelined again on 20 December after suffering a bone bruise in his right shoulder against Zenit Saint Petersburg, with an estimated recovery time of four to six weeks. Wembanyama was selected to the LNB All-Star Game, held on 29 December, but was unable to play due to the injury. He made his return on February 11. On 3 April, Wembanyama recorded a season-high 25 points, seven rebounds and three blocks in an 85–65 win over Le Portel. He scored 18 points, his career-high in the EuroLeague, in an 81–80 loss to Olimpia Milano on 7 April. On 3 June, Wembanyama was ruled out for the remainder of the season with a psoas muscle injury he sustained during a Pro A semifinal game against JDA Dijon. In his absence, ASVEL won its third consecutive Pro A championship. Wembanyama repeated as Pro A Best Young Player, averaging 9.4 points and 5.1 rebounds per game in the league. He averaged 6.5 points and 3.8 rebounds per game in the EuroLeague and finished second to Rokas Jokubaitis in voting for the EuroLeague Rising Star award. After the season, he opted out of his contract with ASVEL, despite promises from club president Tony Parker to build the team around him in the next season.

Metropolitans 92 (2022–present) 

On 4 July 2022, Wembanyama signed a two-year contract with Metropolitans 92 of the LNB Pro A. He was drawn to the team due to head coach Vincent Collet's reputation for developing and providing opportunities for young players. In October 2022, Wembanyama gained recognition from American media after two exhibition games against the NBA G League Ignite, featuring projected second overall pick Scoot Henderson, in Las Vegas. The games, which marked Wembanyama's debut in the United States, were nationally televised and attended by over 200 scouts and NBA executives. In the first game, on 4 October, he recorded 37 points, five blocks and four rebounds in a 122–115 loss. Wembanyama led his team to a 112–106 win over the Ignite in their second game, scoring 36 points and grabbing 11 rebounds. On 27 October, the NBA announced that it would stream all Metropolitans 92 regular season and playoff games through its app.

In the 2022–23 Pro A season, Wembanyama emerged as one of the most dominant players in the league. On 4 November 2022, he posted a career-high 33 points, 12 rebounds, four assists and three blocks in a 78–69 win over Limoges CSP. On 2 December, Wembanyama recorded his fourth straight 30-point game, with 32 points, 10 rebounds, four blocks and three assists in a 96–85 victory over Fos Provence, leading his team to its ninth consecutive win. He was named captain of the France team at the LNB All-Star Game on 29 December. At the All-Star Game, he recorded 27 points, 12 rebounds and four assists, leading his team to 136–128 win over the World team, and became the game's youngest MVP. On 9 January 2023, Wembanyama made a game-winning putback dunk with 3.5 seconds left in regulation and recorded 15 points, nine rebounds and five blocks in an 84–83 win over ASVEL.

National team career

Junior national team 
Wembanyama represented France at the 2019 FIBA U16 European Championship in Udine, Italy. In an 80–78 quarterfinal win over Croatia, he recorded 12 points, 21 rebounds and eight blocks. Wembanyama averaged nine points, 9.6 rebounds and a tournament-leading 5.3 blocks per game, leading France to a silver medal and earning all-tournament team honors.

He then competed at the 2021 FIBA Under-19 Basketball World Cup in Latvia. Wembanyama averaged 14 points, 7.4 rebounds and 5.7 blocks per game, and was named to the all-tournament team after leading France to the silver medal. He recorded 22 points, eight rebounds and eight blocks in an 83–81 loss to the United States in the final. Wembanyama set the FIBA record for blocks per game in a single tournament.

Senior national team 
Wembanyama was on the preliminary 17-man roster of the French national team for EuroBasket 2022, but was ruled out a month ahead, due to an injury he suffered at the end of the 2021–22 season. He was selected again for the World Cup qualifiers in November. In his debut with the senior team, on 11 November 2022, he scored 20 points and grabbed nine rebounds in a 90–65 win over Lithuania.

Player profile 

Wembanyama is widely regarded as one of the greatest NBA prospects of his generation, and many publications have described him as the most anticipated prospect since LeBron James in 2003. He emerged as one of Europe's top prospects at age 14 and was viewed by analysts as a potential first overall pick in his draft class by age 16. During his final season before becoming eligible for the 2023 NBA draft, he was the consensus number one pick in draft projections. NBA commissioner Adam Silver said that the league would pay "particular attention" to tanking for the 2023 draft, due to the possibility of acquiring a "once-in-a-generation player" in the draft.

He often plays on the perimeter and has exceptional mobility and skills for his size, with the ability to handle and shoot the ball like a guard. Wembanyama is a capable three-point shooter and his jump shot is difficult to block because of his length. He is a productive scorer in the paint, with soft touch and a variety of post moves, and excels in the pick and roll. Defensively, he is an outstanding shot-blocker due to his length and anticipation, and his fluidity allows him to guard smaller players. His thin frame and lack of strength have been labeled as weaknesses and encourage opponents to use a physical style of play against him. For this reason, he can struggle to box out while rebounding and to defend post-ups. 

Although analysts have noted the unprecedented nature of his game, Wembanyama has drawn comparisons to Kareem Abdul-Jabbar and Ralph Sampson. ESPN draft analyst Mike Schmitz compared his defensive impact to Rudy Gobert and his shooting potential to Kristaps Porziņģis, albeit with better ball-handling and passing skills. John Hollinger of The Athletic described his game as a combination of Sampson, Porziņģis and Dirk Nowitzki. Wembanyama models parts of his game after Kevin Durant and Giannis Antetokounmpo.

Career statistics

EuroLeague

|-
| style="text-align:left;"|2021–22
| style="text-align:left;"|ASVEL
| 13 || 10 || 17.3 || .348 || .303 || .667 || 3.8 || .5 || .4 || 1.9 || 6.5 || 5.5
|-
| colspan=2 | Career
| 13 || 10 || 17.3 || .348 || .303 || .667 || 3.8 || .5 || .4 || 1.9 || 6.5 || 5.5
|}

Off the court

Wembanyama is represented by agent Bouna Ndiaye of Comsport. His family has a longtime relationship with Ndiaye, whose son was coached by Wembanyama's mother from an early age. Ndiaye advised Wembanyama by the time he was 15 years old and signed him as a client in 2022.

Wembanyama was a year ahead for his age in school and attended lycée in agreement with Nanterre 92. He earned his baccalauréat with honors, specializing in earth and life sciences and social and economic sciences.

References

External links 
 LNB profile

2004 births
Living people
ASVEL Basket players
Centers (basketball)
French men's basketball players
French sportspeople of Democratic Republic of the Congo descent
Metropolitans 92 players
Nanterre 92 players
People from Le Chesnay
Sportspeople from Yvelines